Ivan Ćosić (born  in Livno) is a Croatian male volleyball player. He spent most of his career with OK Mladost Marina Kaštela, with whom he won the 2011/12 and 2015/16 national championships. He also played for French Cambrai and Romanian Arcada Galaţi between 2012 and 2015.

Ćosić played with the Croatia men's national volleyball team between 2002 and 2017, participating in eight European Volleyball Championships with them.

References

1984 births
Living people
Croatian men's volleyball players
Sportspeople from Livno